These quarterbacks have started at least one game for the Atlanta Falcons of the National Football League. They are listed in order of the date of each playing at quarterback for the Falcons.

Starting quarterbacks

The number of games they started during the season is listed to the right:

Regular season

Postseason

Most games as starting quarterback
These quarterbacks have the most starts for the Falcons in regular season games (through the 2021 NFL season).

Team career passing records

Regular season 
(Through the 2021 NFL season)

Postseason

See also

 List of NFL starting quarterbacks

References

 
 
 

Atlanta Falcons

Starting quarterbacks